The 1985–86 season was Stoke City's 79th season in the Football League and 26th in the Second Division.

After the previous season's humiliating relegation Stoke's new manager Mick Mills had the tough task of restoring the club's pride. An early 6–2 victory over Leeds United certainly helped to boost morale but with poor crowds Stoke were never going to be involved in the race for promotion and with the squad considered too good to be relegated again a mid-table position of 10th was the final outcome in a season of recovery.

Season review

League
Following last season's debacle, Stoke had the chance to rebuild with their new manager Mick Mills and his assistant Sammy Chung. The Victoria Ground was in a state of depression as there was no money available whatsoever and the fans had deserted the team in their droves. The average attendance had dropped to below 10,000 and there was a genuine concern that the side could fall all the way to the Third Division and there was no doubt that Mills had an enormous task on his hands.

Stoke had a surprisingly good pre-season reaching the final of the Isle of Man Trophy, losing to Blackburn Rovers. But they suffered a 3–1 defeat at home to Sheffield United on the opening day in their first Second Division fixture for six years. But the fans finally had something to cheer about in their next home match as Mark Chamberlain rediscovered his lost form and starred in a 6–2 victory over Leeds United. Money was still a major problem and Sheffield Wednesday moved in to sign Chamberlain for £300,000.

The board hoped that this money would be available for Mills to spend on new players but instead it had to be used to reduce the club's overdraft. Alan Hudson, struggling with injury, decided to retire in November and Mills quickly brought in John Devine from Norwich City; he also promoted youth team player Neil Adams to the first team and he did well as results slowly started to improve. Paul Dyson was sold to West Bromwich Albion and Tony Kelly was signed from Wigan Athletic before the March transfer deadline and with Stoke out of all three cups and no worry of a relegation or promotion race they played out the final league fixtures without any pressure and finished in 10th position.

FA Cup
For the third season running Stoke failed to make it past the third round losing to Notts County.

League Cup
Stoke beat Fourth Division Welsh side Wrexham before losing away at Portsmouth.

Full Members' Cup
With English clubs banned from UEFA competitions due to the Heysel Stadium disaster the FA set up the Full Members' Cup as a replacement. Stoke lost to Oxford United at the semi-final stage.

Final league table

Results

Stoke's score comes first

Legend

Football League Second Division

FA Cup

League Cup

Full Members' Cup

Isle of Man Trophy

Friendlies

Squad statistics

References

Stoke City F.C. seasons
Stoke